Modest may refer to:

 A number of saints, see under Saint Modest (disambiguation)
 Michael Modest (born 1971), semi-retired American professional wrestler
 Modest (email client), a free, open source, e-mail client

People with the given name Modest or Modesty:

 Modest Altschuler (1873–1963), cellist, orchestral conductor, and composer
 Modest Isopescu (1895–1948), soldier, administrator and convicted war criminal
 Modest Morariu (1929–1988), poet, essayist, prose writer and translator
 Modest Mussorgsky (1839–1881), Russian composer
 Modest Romiszewski (1861–1930), military theorist
 Modest Schoepen (Bobbejaan Schoepen) (1925–2010), Belgian singer-songwriter, entertainer and founder of the Bobbejaanland amusement park
 Modest Ilyich Tchaikovsky (1850–1916), Russian dramatist, opera librettist and translator
 Modest Urgell (1839–1919), Spanish painter, illustrator, and playwright
 Modesty Napunyi (1957–2002), boxer

In fiction:
 Modesty Blaise, character of the eponymous comic strip

See also
 Modesty Blaise (disambiguation) 1963 comic strip and its adaptations
 Humility
 Modeste (disambiguation)
 Modesty
 Modest Mouse
 Modesty Handicap (horse race)
 Modesty, 1752 sculpture by Antonio Corradini

Given names
Surnames